Isaura Palaea, in Latin Isaura Vetus, both meaning 'Old Isaura', and perhaps identical to Isauropolis, was a Roman and Byzantine era town in southern Turkey. The city has been identified with modern Zengibar Kalesi, Bozkır, Konya Province.

In antiquity the city was in Isauria (Ἰσαυρία) district of Lycaonia in today's southern Turkey (modern Konya Province). Its site is identified as near Bozkır.

History

Before the Romans the town was a strongly fortified city of the Isaurians, located at the foot of Mt. Taurus. It was besieged by Perdiccas, the Macedonian regent after Alexander the Great's death, the Isaurians set the place alight and let it perish in flames rather than submit to capture. Large quantities of molten gold were found afterwards by the Macedonians among the ashes and ruins. The town was rebuilt, but was destroyed a second time by the Roman, Servilius Isauricus, and thenceforth it remained a heap of ruins. Strabo states that the place was ceded by the Romans to Amyntas of Galatia. It was rebuilt by Amyntas at a new location and called Isaura Nea ('New Isaura').

From 492-496 the area was fought over between emperor Anastasius I and the local rebels, in what was to become known as the Isaurian War.

The Seljuq Turks managed to take control of the area in the late 11th century, after the Battle of Manzikert.

References

Populated places in ancient Isauria
Populated places in ancient Lycaonia
Ancient Greek archaeological sites in Turkey
Roman towns and cities in Turkey
Former populated places in Turkey
Populated places of the Byzantine Empire
Defunct dioceses of the Ecumenical Patriarchate of Constantinople